Saint Joseph Hospital was a Catholic operated hospital located at 220 Overton Avenue in Memphis, Tennessee. It is most well known for being the hospital where Martin Luther King Jr. died at 7:05 p.m. on Thursday, April 4, 1968, an hour after he was shot at Lorraine Motel.

Erected in 1885 and operated by the Sisters of St. Francis, St. Joseph's later became a Medical Center with 1,212 beds. In 1997 the hospital merged with Baptist Memorial Health Care. The property and buildings were then sold to St. Jude Children's Research Hospital. The buildings, except for a recently built emergency room annex which St. Jude converted into a Translational Trials Unit, were subsequently demolished to make room for an expansion. The merger between St. Joseph's and Baptist Memorial Health Care was completed in 1998 and the last patients were transferred to Baptist on November 17, 2000.

See also
Saint Joseph

References 

Hospital buildings completed in 1885
Hospitals in Memphis, Tennessee
Catholic hospitals in North America
Assassination of Martin Luther King Jr.
Hospitals established in 1885
Demolished buildings and structures in Tennessee